"Sober Up" is the third single from AJR's second studio album The Click and features Weezer frontman Rivers Cuomo, although some radio stations play a version with AJR's Ryan singing Cuomo's part. "Sober Up" became the first number one song for AJR when it peaked at number one on the Billboard Alternative Songs chart in March 2018. Similarly, Cuomo had his first number one on the alternative Billboard chart as a solo artist.

Background
AJR had written most of "Sober Up" before reaching out to Rivers Cuomo of Weezer.
After following AJR on Twitter, the band as well as Cuomo expressed admiration for each other's work, in which they later asked if he wanted to collaborate with them. Cuomo was sent an unfinished version of the song that was missing a bridge. To complete "Sober Up", Cuomo wrote and sang the bridge. Cuomo had 3 versions: one in Spanish, one that was nonsensical, and the one that was eventually accepted into the final track.

Composition
In an interview with Billboard, Jack and Ryan Met revealed the inspiration to "Sober Up" came to them during their time at Columbia University. While at Columbia, the Met brothers felt that they were missing their childhood. Using their feelings of loneliness, the Mets were compelled to pen a song about Jack phoning up his crush he had in the second grade of elementary school.

Live performances
In January 2018, AJR performed "Sober Up" on Jimmy Kimmel Live! alongside their previous hit "Weak". Cuomo later joined the band for shows in March and April in Los Angeles and has also covered it for a couple solo shows including one in San Francisco.

Chart performance
In March 2018, "Sober Up" peaked at number one on the Billboard Alternative Songs chart and was the first number one song for AJR. For Rivers Cuomo, "Sober Up" was his first song to reach number one on Billboards Alternative chart as a solo artist outside of Weezer.

Reception
iHeartRadio said "Sober Up" was a positive song despite the difficult lyrics.

Music video
On January 31, 2018, a music video for "Sober Up" was released. In the music video, the band is walking through New York City while singer Jack Met meets a younger version of himself.

Charts

Weekly charts

Year-end charts

Certifications

See also
List of Billboard number-one alternative singles of the 2010s

References

2017 singles
2017 songs
AJR (band) songs
Black Butter Records singles
Rivers Cuomo songs
Songs written by Rivers Cuomo